Santa Branca is a municipality in the state of São Paulo in Brazil. It is part of the Metropolitan Region of Vale do Paraíba e Litoral Norte. The population is 14,857 (2020 est.) in an area of 272.24 km2. The elevation is 648 m. The Rodovia Governador Carvalho Pinto (SP-070) passes north of Santa Branca.

The municipality contains part of the  Mananciais do Rio Paraíba do Sul Environmental Protection Area, created in 1982 to protect the sources of the Paraíba do Sul river.

References

External links
  http://www.santabranca.sp.gov.br
  citybrazil.com.br
  Santa Branca on Explorevale

Municipalities in São Paulo (state)